Walter Bud (born 1 August 1890 in Leipzig; died 11 May 1915 in the Battle of Ypres) was a German painter.

Literature
Bud, Walter. In: Hans Vollmer (ed): Allgemeines Lexikon der bildenden Künstler des XX. Jahrhunderts. Band 1: A–D. E. A. Seemann, Leipzig 1953, p. 343.
Volker Frank: Bud, Walter. In: Allgemeines Künstlerlexikon. Die Bildenden Künstler aller Zeiten und Völker (AKL). Band 15, Saur, München u. a. 1996, ISBN 3-598-22755-8, p. 11.
Christian Lenz et al. (rev.): Deutsche Künstler von Marées bis Slevogt. Hirmer, München 2003 (= Bayerische Staatsgemäldesammlungen München: Catalogues of Paintings, vol. 8)

External links
 Alicja Andrzejewska: [https://issuu.com/muzeumnarodowegdansk/docs/e-biuletyn_1_2015-calosc Zając. Walter Bud (1890-1915). Z historii wartych przypomnienia]. In: e-biuletyn Muzeum Narodowego w Gdańsku 1, pp. 26–45, 2015. Wojciech Bonisławski – red. naczelny. Gdańsk: Muzeum Narodowe w Gdańsku. ISSN 2353-5040 (pol.)
 Akademie der Bildenden Künste München: matriculation entry of Walter Bud
 Katalog 61: Versteigerung neuer Handzeichnungen, Originalgraphik und Gemälde aus den Sammlungen S.-Melbourne und N.-Leipzig. P.H. Beyer & Sohn, Leipzig 1931

References

1890 births
1915 deaths
20th-century German painters
20th-century German male artists
German military personnel killed in World War I
German Army personnel of World War I